Foreshadowing is a literary technique.

Foreshadowing or The Foreshadowing may also refer to:

 Foreshadowing Our Demise, second album of Skinless, a rock band
The Foreshadowing (band), an Italian metal band
The Foreshadowing (novel), by Marcus Sedgwick

See also 
 Foreshadow (disambiguation)